The Dominica Olympic Committee (IOC code: DMA) is the National Olympic Committee representing Dominica. The committee is also the Commonwealth Games Association representing the island nation.

History
It was created in 1987 and recognized by the National Olympic Committee in 1993.

See also
Dominica at the Olympics
Dominica at the Commonwealth Games

References

External links 
 
Dominica Olympic Committee

Dominica
Dominica
Dominica at the Olympics
Oly
Sports organizations established in 1987